Holy Trinity Church, Ratcliffe-on-Soar is a Grade I listed parish church in the Church of England in Ratcliffe-on-Soar.

It is part of an informal grouping of five churches that are known collectively as "The 453 Churches" as they straddle the A453. The other churches in the group are:
St. Lawrence's Church, Gotham
St. George's Church, Barton in Fabis
St. Winifred's Church, Kingston on Soar
All Saints’ Church, Thrumpton

History

The church dates from the 13th century. Major restoration work was carried out in 1886, paid for by Earl Howe at a cost of £830.

Incumbents

1239 W De-Shenedon
1270 Henry de Halton
1292 Richard de Hertford
???? John de Sandale
1326 Walter de Alford
1331 John Gerard
1342 Walter de Melburn
???? Robert de Treford
1352 John de Ditton
1359 Henry de Blakeburn
1359 John de Kyneton
1385 Thomas de Basford
1391 Richard Gower
???? Richard Balle
1416 Richard de Wynwyke
???? John Ray
1419 William Hickson
???? William Wilme
1429 Hugo Beton
???? Richard Ives
1450 Laurence Whalley
1461 James Allerton
1471 John Buttiller
1478 John Prescott
1497 Henry Riding
1497 Hector Ridyng
1509 Thomas Wynter
1543 John Rolston
1553 John Drewry
1579 Edward Barwell
1579 John Alrede
1590 Thomas Banham
1634 Richard Francell
1653 R Hancock
1662 H Grove
1668 Robert Holmes
1688 John Gilbert
1730 Thomas Poynton
1765 James Deavin
1768 Thomas Bentley
1778 John Topham
1783 Richard Dodsley
1791 Edward Smith
1800 R D Flamstead
1830 William Phelps
1835 J J Vaughan
1882 F A Wodehouse
1916 R O Jones
1932 C V Brown
1936 H N Wrigley
1940 P F New
1943 B P Hall
1946 J F F Marton
1953 C Brailsford
1958 J M Williams
1963 J W Mayer
1970 N Copeland
1971 ? Yates
1971 J Gibson
1972 A D Williams
1981 A C Sutherland
1996 David Gorrick
???? Richard Spray
2001 Stephen Osman
2011 Richard Coleman

Memorials

The church contains a number of memorials to the Sacheverell family including
An alabaster monument to Henrie Sacheverell, died 1625
An alabaster monument to Henrie and Jane Sacheverell, c. 1590
An alabaster monument to Henry Sacheverell and his wife, 1558
An alabaster monument to Ralph Sacheverell and his wife, 1539,

Organ

The church has a single manual pipe organ which was purchased from St. Winifred's Church, Kingston on Soar in 1936 for a total cost of £29. It was originally hand pumped at a salary of 15 shillings per year. An electric blower was fitted in 1946. It was moved to the north aisle in 1973. A specification of the organ can be found on the National Pipe Organ Register.

Bells
There are three bells in the tower but they are of irregular interval so when chimed together they do not sound musical.

References

External links
 Southwell & Nottingham church history project

Ratcliffe on Soarl
Grade I listed churches in Nottinghamshire